Strandavatnet is a lake in Hol municipality, Norway.
The lake is a reservoir for the Rud hydroelectric powerstation in Hovet, Buskerud. In 1952/1953 a dam was constructed which lifted the lake level 28 meters, thus the lake varies between 950 and 978 m above sea level.

First rock filling dam in Norway
The dam in the Strandavatnet was the first rock filling (embankment) dam in Norway. You can see the dam on your left hand side from FV 50 at Myrland (the road to Raggsteindalen goes over the dam). The Hol 1 power station, in Hovet, Buskerud utilizes water from two watercourses, Urunda, where Strandavatnet, is the intake reservoir, and Votna where Varaldset is the intake reservoir. Stolsvatnet is the biggest and highest reservoir in the Votna watercourse. See figure below.

Overview of two watercourses

Photos

Sources
E-Co Energi

References

Hol
Lakes of Viken (county)
Reservoirs in Norway